This is a list of the members of the 19th Seanad Éireann, the upper house of the Oireachtas (legislature) of Ireland.  These Senators were elected or appointed in 1989, after the 1989 general election and served until the close of poll for the 20th Seanad in 1993.

Composition of the 19th Seanad 
There are a total of 60 seats in the Seanad. 43 Senators are elected by the Vocational panels, 6 elected by the Universities and 11 are nominated by the Taoiseach.

The following table shows the composition by party when the 19th Seanad first met on 1 November 1989.

List of senators

Changes

See also 
Members of the 26th Dáil
Government of the 26th Dáil

Sources

References 

 
19